Richard Theodore Neer is William B. Ogden Distinguished Service Professor in Art History, Cinema & Media Studies and the College, and an affiliate of the Department of Classics, at the University of Chicago. Neer is also Executive Editor of Critical Inquiry.

Selected publications
Corpus Vasorum Antiquorum. Malibu, J. Paul Getty Museum, Fascicle 7. Malibu: The J. Paul Getty Museum, 1997. 
Style and politics in Athenian vase-painting: The craft of democracy, ca. 530-460 B.C.E. Cambridge: Cambridge University Press, 2002. 
The Emergence of the Classical Style in Greek Sculpture. Chicago: University of Chicago Press, 2010. 
Art & Archaeology of the Greek World: A New History, c. 2500 - c. 150 BCE. London: Thames & Hudson, 2011.

References

External links
Richard Neer's C.V. Archived here. Archived here.

Year of birth missing (living people)
Living people
University of Chicago faculty
American art historians